Tambo may refer to:

People
 Adelaide Tambo (1929–2007), South African anti-apartheid activist
 Dali Tambo (born 1959), South African anti-apartheid activist, TV presenter and also son of Oliver Tambo and Adelaide Tambo
 Oliver Tambo (1917–1993), South African anti-apartheid activist
 Thembi Tambo, British-South African diplomat, politician and also daughter of Oliver Tambo and Adelaide Tambo

Places

Australia

Queensland 

Tambo, Queensland, a locality in Blackall-Tambo Region
Shire of Tambo (Queensland), a former local government area

Victoria 

Tambo River (Victoria)
County of Tambo, Victoria
Mount Tambo, Victoria
Shire of Tambo (Victoria)

Peru
 Tambo River (Peru)
 Tambo District, Huaytará
 Tambo District, La Mar

Elsewhere
 Pizzo Tambò, a mountain in the Swiss Alps near the Splügen Pass
 Tambo Island, in Pontevedra, Spain
 Tambo, Parañaque, in the Philippines

Art, entertainment, and media

Fictional characters
 Tambo, a character in minstrel shows who plays tambourine
 Shelly Tambo, a fictional character in the US television series Northern Exposure

Other
 Tambo (Incan structure), a building found along Incan roads
 Tambo (weapon), a very short staff used in martial arts

See also
 El Tambo (disambiguation)
OR Tambo (disambiguation), things named after Oliver Tambo